Anammox, an abbreviation for "anaerobic ammonium oxidation", is a globally important microbial process of the nitrogen cycle that takes place in many natural environments. The bacteria mediating this process were identified in 1999, and were a great surprise for the scientific community. In the anammox reaction, nitrite and ammonium ions are converted directly into diatomic nitrogen and water.

The bacteria that perform the anammox process are genera that belong to the bacterial phylum Planctomycetota. The anammox bacteria all possess one anammoxosome, a lipid bilayer membrane-bound compartment inside the cytoplasm in which the anammox process takes place. The anammoxosome membranes are rich in ladderane lipids; the presence of these lipids is so far unique in biology.

"Anammox" is also the trademarked name for an anammox-based ammonium removal technology developed by the Delft University of Technology.

Process background

In this biological process, which is a comproportionation reaction, nitrite and ammonium ions are converted directly into diatomic nitrogen and water. 
 +  →  + .

Globally, this process may be responsible for 30–50% of the  gas produced in the oceans. It is thus a major sink for fixed nitrogen and so limits oceanic primary productivity.

The bacteria that perform the anammox process belong to the bacterial phylum Planctomycetota. Currently, five anammox genera have been discovered: Brocadia, Kuenenia, Anammoxoglobus, Jettenia (all fresh water species), and Scalindua (marine species). The anammox bacteria are characterized by several striking properties: 

 They all possess one anammoxosome, a membrane bound compartment inside the cytoplasm which is the locus of anammox catabolism. Further, the membranes of these bacteria mainly consist of ladderane lipids so far unique in biology. 
 Of special interest is the conversion to hydrazine (normally used as a high-energy rocket fuel, and poisonous to most living organisms) as an intermediate. 
 A final striking feature of the organism is the extremely slow growth rate; the doubling time is anywhere from 7–22 days. 

The anammox bacteria are geared towards converting their substrates at very low concentrations; in other words, they have a very high affinity to their substrates ammonium and nitrite (sub-micromolar range). Anammox cells are packed with cytochrome c type proteins (≈30% of the protein complement), including the enzymes that perform the key catabolic reactions of the anammox process, making the cells remarkably red. The anammox process was originally found to occur only from 20 °C to 43 °C but more recently, anammox has been observed at temperatures from 36 °C to 52 °C in hot springs and 60 °C to 85 °C at hydrothermal vents located along the Mid-Atlantic Ridge.

History

In 1932, it was reported that dinitrogen gas was generated via an unknown mechanism during fermentation in the sediments of Lake Mendota, Wisconsin, USA. In 1965, F. A. Richards noticed that most of the ammonium that should be produced during the anaerobic remineralization of organic matter was unaccounted for. As there was no known biological pathway for this transformation, biological anaerobic oxidation of ammonium received little further attention. 

In 1977, Engelbert Broda predicted the existence of two chemolithoautotrophic microorganisms capable of oxidizing ammonium to dinitrogen gas on the basis of thermodynamic calculations. It was thought that anaerobic oxidation of ammonium would not be feasible, assuming that the predecessors had tried and failed to establish a biological basis for those reactions. By the 1990s, Arnold Mulder's observations were just consistent with Richard's suggestion. In their anoxic denitrifying pilot reactor, ammonium disappeared at the expense of nitrite with a clear nitrogen production. The reactor used the effluent from a methanogenic pilot reactor, which contained ammonium, sulphide and other compounds, and nitrate from a nitrifying plant as the influent. The process was named "anammox," and was realized to have great significance in the removal of unwanted ammonium. 

The discovery of the anammox process was first publicly presented at the 5th European congress on biotechnology. By the mid-1990s, the discovery of anammox in the fluidized bed reactor was published. A maximum ammonium removal rate of 0.4 kg N/m3/d was achieved. It was shown that for every mole of ammonium consumed, 0.6 mol of nitrate was required, resulting in the formation of 0.8 mol of  gas. 

In 1995 the biological nature of anammox was identified. It was realized that, instead of nitrate, nitrite was assumed as the oxidizing agent of ammonium in anammox reaction. Based on a previous study, Strous et al. calculated the stoichiometry of anammox process by mass balancing, which is widely accepted by other groups. Later, anammox bacteria were identified as Planctomycetota, and the first identified anammox organism was named Candidatus "Brocadia anammoxidans." 

Before 2002, anammox was assumed to be a minor player in the nitrogen cycle within natural ecosystems. In 2002 however, anammox was found to play an important part in the biological nitrogen cycle, accounting for 24–67% of the total  production in the continental shelf sediments that were studied. The discovery of anammox process modified the concept of biological nitrogen cycle, as depicted in Figure 2.

Possible reaction mechanisms

According to  labeling experiments carried out in 1997, ammonium is biologically oxidized by hydroxylamine, most likely derived from nitrite, as the probable electron acceptor. The conversion of hydrazine to dinitrogen gas is hypothesized to be the reaction that generates the electron equivalents for the reduction of nitrite to hydroxylamine. In general, two possible reaction mechanisms are addressed: 

 One mechanism hypothesizes that a membrane-bound enzyme complex converts ammonium and hydroxylamine to hydrazine first, followed by the oxidation of hydrazine to dinitrogen gas in the periplasm. At the same time, nitrite is reduced to hydroxylamine at the cytoplasmic site of the same enzyme complex responsible for hydrazine oxidation with an internal electron transport (Figure 3a). 
 The other mechanism postulates the following: ammonium and hydroxylamine are converted to hydrazine by a membrane-bound enzyme complex, hydrazine is oxidized in the periplasm to dinitrogen gas, and the generated electrons are transferred via an electron transport chain to nitrite reducing enzyme in the cytoplasm where nitrite is reduced to hydroxylamine (Figure 3b). 

Whether the reduction of nitrite and the oxidation of hydrazine occur at different sites of the same enzyme or the reactions are catalyzed by different enzyme systems connected via an electron transport chain remains to be investigated. In microbial nitrogen metabolism, the occurrence of hydrazine as an intermediate is rare. Hydrazine has been proposed as an enzyme-bound intermediate in the nitrogenase reaction.
Recently, using detailed molecular analyses and combining complementary methods, Kartal and coworkers published strong evidence supporting the latter mechanism.
Furthermore, the enzyme producing hydrazine, hydrazine synthase was purified and shown to produce hydrazine from NO and ammonium. The production of hydrazine from ammonium and NO was also supported by the resolution of the crystal structure of the enzyme hydrazine sythase.

A possible role of nitric oxide (NO) or nitroxyl (HNO) in anammox was proposed by Hooper et al. by way of condensation of NO or HNO and ammonium on an enzyme related to the ammonium monooxygenase family. The formed hydrazine or imine could subsequently be converted by the enzyme hydroxylamine oxidase to dinitrogen gas, and the reducing equivalents produced in the reaction are required to combine NO or HNO and ammonium or to reduce nitrite to NO. Environmental genomics analysis of the species Candidatus Kuenenia stuttgartiensis, through a slightly different and complementary metabolism mechanism, suggested NO to be the intermediate instead of hydroxylamine (Figure 4). However, this hypothesis also agreed that hydrazine was an important intermediate in the process. In this pathway (Figure 4), there are two enzymes unique to anammox bacteria: hydrazine synthase (hzs) and hydrazine dehydrogenase (hdh). The HZS produces hydrazine from nitric oxide and ammonium, and HDH transfer the electrons from hydrazine to ferredoxin. Few new genes, such as some known fatty acid biosynthesis and S-adenosylmethionine radical enzyme genes, containing domains involved in electron transfer and catalysis have been detected. Anammox microorganisms can also directly couple NO reduction to ammonia oxidation, without the need for nitrite supply.

Another, still unexplored, reaction mechanism involves anaerobic ammonium oxidation on anodes of bio-electrical systems. Such systems can be microbial fuel cells or microbial electrolysis cells. In the absence of dissolved oxygen, nitrite, or nitrate, microbes living in the anode compartment are able to oxidize ammonium to dinitrogen gas (N2) just as in the classical anammox process. At the same time, they unload the liberated electrons onto the anode, producing electrical current. This electrical current can be used either directly in fuel cell mode or for hydrogen and methane gas production in electrolysis mode. While there is no clarity on the reaction mechanism behind, one hypothesis is that nitrite, nitrate, or dinitrogen oxide play a role as intermediates. However, since the process occurs at very low electrochemical potentials, other, more speculative, reaction mechanisms seem possible as well.

Species diversity

Until now, ten anammox species have been described, including seven that are available in laboratory enrichment cultures. All have the taxonomical status of Candidatus, as none were obtained as classical pure cultures. Known species are divided over five genera: 

 Kuenenia, one species: Kuenenia stuttgartiensis. 
 Brocadia, three species: B. anammoxidans, B. fulgida, and B. sinica. 
 Anammoxoglobus, one species: A. propionicus. 
 Jettenia, one species: J. asiatica. 
 Scalindua, four species: S. brodae, S. sorokinii, S. wagneri, and S. profunda. 

Representatives of the first four genera were enriched from sludge from wastewater treatment plants; K. stuttgartiensis, B. anammoxidans, B. fulgida, and A. propionicus were even obtained from the same inoculum. Scalindua dominates the marine environment, but is also found in some freshwater ecosystems and wastewater treatment plants. 

Together, these 10 species likely only represent a minute fraction of anammox biodiversity. For instance, there are currently over 2000 16S rRNA gene sequences affiliated with anammox bacteria that have been deposited to the Genbank (https://www.ncbi.nlm.nih.gov/genbank/), representing an overlooked continuum of species, subspecies, and strains, each apparently having found its specific niche in the wide variety of habitats where anammox bacteria are encountered. Species microdiversity is particularly impressive for the marine representative Scalindua. A question that remains to be investigated is which environmental factors determine species differentiation among anammox bacteria.

The sequence identities of the anammox 16S rRNA genes range from 87 to 99%, and phylogenetic analysis places them all within the phylum Planctomycetota, which form the PVC superphylum together with Verrucomicrobia and Chlamydiae. Within the Planctomycetota, anammox bacteria deeply branch as a monophyletic clade. Their phylogenetic position together with a broad range of specific physiological, cellular, and molecular traits give anammox bacteria their own order Brocadiales.

Application in wastewater treatment
The application of the anammox process lies in the removal of ammonium in wastewater treatment and consists of two separate processes. The first step is partial nitrification (nitritation) of half of the ammonium to nitrite by ammonia oxidizing bacteria:
2 + 3 → 2 + 4 + 2
The resulting ammonium and nitrite are converted in the anammox process to dinitrogen gas and ~15% nitrate (not shown) by anammox bacteria:
 +  →  + 2
Both processes can take place in 1 reactor where two guilds of bacteria form compact granules.

For the enrichment of the anammox organisms a granular biomass or biofilm system seems to be especially suited in which the necessary sludge age of more than 20 days can be ensured. Possible reactors are sequencing batch reactors (SBR), moving bed reactors or gas-lift-loop reactors. The cost reduction compared to conventional nitrogen removal is considerable; the technique is still young but proven in several fullscale installations.

The first full scale reactor intended for the application of anammox bacteria was built in the Netherlands in 2002. In other wastewater treatment plants, such as the one in Germany (Hattingen), anammox activity is coincidentally observed though were not built for that purpose. As of 2006, there are three full scale processes in The Netherlands: one in a municipal wastewater treatment plant (in Rotterdam), and two on industrial effluent. One is a tannery, the other a potato processing plant.

Advantages
Aeration and input of organic substrates (typically methanol) show that these two processes are: 
 
 Highly energy consuming.
 Associated with the production of excess sludge.

Because anammox bacteria convert ammonium and nitrite directly to  anaerobically, this process does not require aeration and other electron donors. Nevertheless, oxygen is still required for the production of nitrite by ammonia-oxidizing bacteria. However, in partial nitritation/anammox systems, oxygen demand is greatly reduced because only half of the ammonium needs to be oxidized to nitrite instead of full conversion to nitrate. The autotrophic nature of anammox bacteria and ammonia-oxidizing bacteria guarantee a low yield and thus less sludge production. Additionally, anammox bacteria easily form stable self-aggregated biofilm (granules) allowing reliable operation of compact systems characterized by high biomass concentration and conversion rate up to 5–10 kg N m−3. Overall, it has been shown that efficient application of the anammox process in wastewater treatment results in a cost reduction of up to 60% as well as lower  emissions.

Disadvantages
The doubling time is slow, between 10 days to 2 weeks. This makes it difficult to grow enough sludge for a wastewater treatment reactor. Also the recovery time after the loss of sludge by accident is longer than in conventional nitrogen removal systems. On the other hand, this slow growing rate is an advantage due to the reduction of surplus sludge that needs to be removed and treated. Depending on the exact species, the optimum pH level is 8. Therefore, it can be necessary to adjust the pH of the wastewater by adding caustic.

References

Nitrogen cycle
Environmental microbiology